Tumachlar may refer to:
 Tumachlar, Jafarbay-ye Gharbi
 Tumachlar, Jafarbay-ye Sharqi
 Tumachlar-e Altin